An intracapsular fracture is a bone fracture located within the joint capsule. Examples of intracapsular fractures includes:
 In the hip: Fractures of the femoral head and femoral neck.

See also
 Extracapsular fracture
 Intraarticular fracture

Bone fractures